"All the Way Up" is a 2009 song performed by actress/singer Emily Osment from her debut extended play, All the Right Wrongs. It was released on August 25, 2009 as the lead single from the album. The song was co-written by Emily Osment and Anthony Fagenson, and was produced by James Maxwell Collins. Lyrically, Osment stated she wanted the song to be about "breaking out" and that "a lot of kids can relate to that".

The song received generally positive reviews from music critics. Some have praised Osment's "spunk", and also make comment about how she chose not to join with Hollywood Records, like most other Disney Channel artist and instead joined Wind-Up Records (the label that is home to Creed and Evanescence). However, some call the song childish, stating that Osment tries to come across as "fierce", but just falls flat in the end. However, some have praised the single, calling it a magnificent start to her career. Osment herself has stated that the song is influenced by Alanis Morissette's album, Jagged Little Pill.

"All the Way Up" failed to garner much attention on the music charts, but it did manage to enter the charts in a few international territories, as well as becoming a hit on Radio Disney. The music video was directed by Roman White and features Osment, along with the band and labelmates Push Play rehearsing a performance of the song in their apartment. The video shows the effects the loud music has on all of the surrounding apartments. "All the Way Up" was performed on Osment's first tour, the "Clap Your Hands Tour", as well as the American talk show, The View.

Background
"All the Way Up" was co-written by Osment, along with James Maxwell Collins and Anthony Fagenson. The song was recorded by Osment while on the set of the hit Disney show, Hannah Montana. She stated during an interview that the song was finished after nearly 3 months of working on it. The single was debuted on Radio Disney on August 25, 2009, and was released for radio airplay the following day. Originally, You Are the Only One was intended to be released as the lead single. However, Osment pushed for the release of "All the Way Up", and eventually her record label agreed to release it as her debut single.

Composition
"All the Way Up" has an emphasis mainly on the bass and drums, but the guitar is also dominant in the song. Osment has listed Alanis Morissette as one of the main inspirations for the single, and album in general. She stated that Morissette's album Jagged Little Pill was the main influence for her musical career, and that she had incorporated themes from the album into her own. When being interviewed about the single, Osment stated
“That song was written about a year ago and I recorded the final recording three or four months ago. I wrote it with Tony Fagenson and Max Collins.... When we first wrote it we wanted to write a song about breaking out... A lot of kids can connect with that because we all have strange habits.

The lyrics to "All the Way Up" were co-written by Osment, with all of her teenage fans in mind. It speaks of wanting to break out, and just be who you want to be. The main example of this theme is shown in the chorus of the single, when Osment sings the line, "All the way up, all the way down. Never look back, it's time to break out!" "All the Way Up" is constructed with the common verse-chorus pattern.

Reception

Critical reception
Critical response to "All the Way Up" was generally mixed, with the majority of critics leaning more toward the positive side. Andrew Leahy, of allmusic, stated that "After flirting with pop and country on her early recordings, Emily Osment underwent a rock & roll makeover for her debut EP, All the Right Wrongs." They also went on to state that "Despite some fairly catchy songs, [Osment] never quite shakes [herself] free of the Disney machine: [she] embraces Auto-Tune, emphasizes overly polished production, and generally whittles away at the sharp teeth these tunes might've otherwise had. In their review of the album, absolutepunk.net stated "All The Way Up, though upbeat, contains mundane lyrics (“Its my life, it’s a riot/ Come on, baby, you can’t deny it”), and boring pop melodies." They even went on to say that Oment was suffering a major identity crisis (referring to her signing with Wind-up Records instead of Hollywood Records like most Disney artist.)

The single did receive positive reviews as well, though. In their review of the single, sodahead.com said the song was their favorite on the album. They went on to say that the song was very "fun", and makes you "wanna get up and dance!"

Chart performance
"All the Way Up" received little promotion and failed to make a major impact in most musical charts worldwide. The song also managed to chart on the Canadian Hot 100, debuting at number 77 on the chart the week of its release. After rising up one spot to 76 the following week, it then fell to 94, before completely falling off the chart the following week.

Music video

Concept
The official music video for "All the Way Up" was directed by Roman White. It was filmed in last July 2009, and was released on August 25, 2009, the same as the release date of the song. American band Push Play appear in the video for the song, as Osment's backing band. This is a reference to the fact that Osment had just starred in the music video for their single "Midnight Romeo", which was also directed by White. The video features Osment and Push Play performing the song in their apartment, while the people in the surrounding apartments listen in. Eventually, the music becomes so loud that the building begins to fall apart. When asked about the concept of the video, Osment said
"The video was so fun, Push Play plays my band [...] We're buddies," [...] "It was really fun we shot it in a mock apartment where you could see what's going on in every room [...] I'm playing music upstairs and you can see how it's affecting all the rooms below."

Synopsis
The video starts out by introducing Osment and Push Play, as well as the other people living in the building, which include an old woman (located in the apartment below Osment), a young couple (located in the apartment diagonal to Osment), and a teenage boy (located to Osment's right) holding a guitar. It then cuts to Osment as she sings the opening line of the song. The young couple overhear her playing as they sit down to eat a meal, and they appear to enjoy the song. The teenage boy then begins to hear the song, and smiles, nodding his head to the beat. After showing Osment sing a few more lines of the verse, it cuts to the old woman. You can see the lamp of her coffee table shaking, and the song appears to be less appealing to her than the other tenants. It then cuts to Osment as she proceeds to sing the chorus. As Osment begins the second verse, the teenage boy is shown pressing his ear against the wall to get a better listen. He also begins to tap his hand and foot to the beat of the song. The old woman, however, begins to cover her ears. After that doesn't work, she begins to yell. The young couple are eating their meal while listening to Osment, and still enjoy the music, despite it making the kitchen table shake like crazy. As Osment begins to sing the second chorus, a small part of the ceiling is shown falling off. The couple begin to dance to the song, as the ceiling still continues to break apart. The teenage boy begins to play air guitar as the third verse begins, while the old woman begins hitting the ceiling with a broom. As the third chorus begins, the entire ceiling begins to fall apart, but Osment still continues to sing the song. As Osment performs the final chorus, the ceiling begins caving in on her, but she ignores it and continues singing. After she finishes the song, the old woman, the teenage boy, and the couple all go back to what they were doing before the music began.

Promotion
In an attempt to promote the single, Osment did many interviews with television networks and radio shows. She also participated in several Q&A sessions with fans, as well as doing interviews on many blog websites. Unlike Osment's previous songs (the ones recorded for soundtracks on Disney), "All the Way Up" didn't receive any promotion from Disney Channel, due to Osment's label being Wind-up Records, instead of Hollywood. Osment made an appearance on popular daytime talk show The View, in which she was interviewed about her new album and single. After the interview, she performed the single live. The performance was met with some criticism, however, due to Osment's vocals. Osment claimed sickness was the reason for her poor vocal ability. Osment also performed the single on her "Halloween Bash", as well as on her "Clap Your Hands" tour. She also performed  a set of songs on the local television station Orange Lounge. On October 29, the song was performed on Canadian music TV Much Music on MuchOnDemand. The following morning, the single was performed on the Canadian television series, Breakfast Television.

Track listing
 "All the Way Up" - 3:12 (album version)
 "All the Way Up" - 3:10 (Radio Edit)

Charts

References

2009 singles
Emily Osment songs
Music videos directed by Roman White
2009 songs
Wind-up Records singles